Zigoni is a surname. Notable people with the surname include:

Gianfranco Zigoni (born 1944), Italian footballer, father of Gianmarco
Gianmarco Zigoni (born 1991), Italian footballer

See also
Zingoni